Luxury is a 1921 American silent drama film directed by Marcel Perez and starring Rubye De Remer, Walter Miller and Fred Kalgren.

Cast
 Rubye De Remer as Blanche Young
 Walter Miller as Harry Morton
 Fred Kalgren as Joseph Burns
 Henry W. Pemberton as John Morton, Harry's stepbrother
 Grace Parker as Morton's Wife
 Rose Mintz as Olga Pompom
 Tom Magrane as Detective Healy

References

Bibliography
 Armitage, John. Luxury and Visual Culture. Bloomsbury Publishing, 2019.
 Munden, Kenneth White. The American Film Institute Catalog of Motion Pictures Produced in the United States, Part 1. University of California Press, 1997.

External links
 

1921 films
1921 drama films
1920s English-language films
American silent feature films
Silent American drama films
Films directed by Marcel Perez
Arrow Film Corporation films
1920s American films